CLD may refer to:

Medicine 
Cholesterol-lowering drug
Chronic liver disease
Chronic lung disease

Transport 
Chelsfield railway station in Orpington, London (National Rail station code: CLD)
 ChairLift Detachable, a classification of a Detachable chairlift
McClellan–Palomar Airport in CarLsbaD, California (IATA Code: CLD)

Science and technology 
 Causal loop diagram for modeling dynamic systems
 The Center for Life Detection, a NASA-supported collaboration of researchers in the science of detecting life beyond the Earth
 Chaldean Neo-Aramaic (language), in ISO 639-3 code (list of all codes beginning with "c")
 , the clear direction flag instruction on x86 compatible CPUs, opposite of 
 CLD chromophore in organic chemistry and polymeric nonlinear optics
 CLD player, a series of Laserdisc players with CD playback from Pioneer
 Color layout descriptor, a summary used in digital image processing to capture the spatial distribution of color in an image
 Command Definition Language, for defining commands for use with DIGITAL Command Language
 Configurable Logic Device, synonym for PLD
 Constrained-layer damping, a mechanical engineering technique for suppression of vibration
 Current limiting diode, otherwise known as constant current diode in electronics

Other 
 Charles Lutwidge Dodgson, the pen name of Lewis Carroll